Percibal Blades (born 1 April 1943, in Panama City) is a Panamanian former basketball player who competed in the 1968 Summer Olympics.

References

1943 births
Living people
Sportspeople from Panama City
Panamanian men's basketball players
1970 FIBA World Championship players
Olympic basketball players of Panama
Basketball players at the 1968 Summer Olympics
Basketball players at the 1967 Pan American Games
Pan American Games bronze medalists for Panama
Pan American Games medalists in basketball
Medalists at the 1967 Pan American Games